Mary Elliott Flanery (April 27, 1867 – July 19, 1933) was an American progressive era social reformer, suffragist, politician, and journalist who is best remembered as the first woman elected to the Kentucky General Assembly and first woman elected to a state legislature south of the Mason–Dixon line. Flanery was an advocate for equal rights for women, and actively worked to pass legislation that would give women the right to vote.

Family and early life
Mary Elliott, daughter of Benjamin Franklin Elliott and Nancy (Kegley) Elliott, was born April 27, 1867 in a part of Carter County, Kentucky that would later become Elliott County, Kentucky. After completing her schooling at University of Charleston in West Virginia and the University of Kentucky, she was a public school teacher.

Family
Mary married William "Harvey" Flanery on June 28, 1893, and moved with him to Ann Arbor, Michigan. The Flanery family moved to Pikeville, Kentucky in 1896 for Harvey to work for Northern Coal and Coke as an attorney.

Harvey and Mary had five children together; Sue, Merle, Dawn, Dew, and John.

Journalism and literary interests
While residing in Pikeville, Mary Flanery began a career as a writer. From 1904 until 1926, she worked as a journalist for the Ashland Daily Independent. She wrote a column called "Impressions of Kentucky's Legislature," and she advocated for legislation as a means for social reform.

Flanery personally supported the publication of books by female African-American poet Effie Waller Smith, who lived and worked in Pike County, Kentucky.

Women's rights advocate
Flanery was a member of the Kentucky Equal Right Association, and actively worked for women to have the right to vote. She worked for to improve the lives of women through reform of suffrage, marriage, and divorce laws.

Kentucky Legislator
After women gained suffrage in Kentucky, in 1921, Flanery ran as the Democratic party candidate for a seat in the Kentucky House of Representative from the 89th District representing Boyd County, Kentucky and won by a 250-vote margin. When Flanery took her seat in the lower house of the General Assembly in January 1922, she was the first female state legislator elected in Kentucky and the first female legislator elected south of the Mason–Dixon line.

As an legislator, Flanery continued her advocacy for women's rights. She urged her colleagues to change legislation about marriage and divorce, and to implement the federal Shepard-Towner Maternity Act, a progressive era program that provided medical care to pregnant women and their children.

Flanery's time in the General Assembly ended with an unsuccessful campaign for Secretary of State in 1923. She was defeated by another female trailblazer, Emma Guy Cromwell, who was the first female to hold a statewide office. Flanery stayed active in politics and was a delegate to the Democratic National Convention in 1924.

Later life, death, and legacy
Flanery was active member of in the General Federation of Women's Clubs of Kentucky. She was a member of the Daughters of the Revolution and in 1926, she founded the John Milton Elliott chapter of the United Daughters of the Confederacy.

Death
Flanery died at her residence, Elliot Hall, in Cattlettsburg on July 19, 1933, and was buried at Ashland Cemetery in Ashland, Kentucky.

Legacy
After Flanery became the first woman elected to the Kentucky State legislature, she was honored by the Kentucky Historical Society as Kentucky's Most Prominent Female. Mary Elliott Flanery is remembered today as a trailblazer for her work as a social reformer and her advocacy for women's rights through her work as a journalist and politician. In 1963, the Kentucky General Assembly honored Flanery by placing a bronze plaque at her desk in the Kentucky House of Representatives.  In 2005, Kentucky Commission on Women recognized her by adding her portrait to the "Kentucky Women Remembered" exhibit at the Kentucky State Capitol building.

References

American suffragists
Democratic Party members of the Kentucky House of Representatives
People from Boyd County, Kentucky
1867 births
1933 deaths
Women state legislators in Kentucky
University of Charleston alumni
University of Kentucky alumni
People from Elliott County, Kentucky
American social reformers
American women journalists
20th-century American non-fiction writers
American women columnists
20th-century American women writers